Eloy is a surname. Notable people with the surname include:

Albert Eloy (1927–2008), French footballer
Jean-Claude Éloy (born 1938), French composer
Mário Eloy (1900–1951), Portuguese expressionist painter

See also
Eloi (name)